Frederic Emanuel Risser (January 15, 1900September 1, 1971) was an American lawyer and Progressive politician.  He served twelve years as a member of the Wisconsin State Senate from Dane County.  He was the father of Wisconsin state senator Fred A. Risser, the longest-serving state legislator in American history.

Early life and education 
Risser was born in the Buffalo, Buffalo County, Wisconsin, on January 15, 1900. After he graduated from Winona High School in Winona, Minnesota, he spent two years on his father's farm before enrolling at the University of Wisconsin–Madison, where he received his bachelor's degree in 1923 and his LL.B. in 1925.

Career 
He taught at Beaver Dam High School for one year, and in 1925 became a practicing attorney in Madison, Wisconsin, entering the law firm of and eventually forming a partnership with former state legislator Ernest Warner. From 1925 to 1930, he lectured on business law at Madison College.

Wisconsin Senate 
Before his election to the Senate in 1936, Risser had served as town clerk of the Town of Madison from 1927 to 1928; treasurer of the Highlands Mendota Beach School from 1930 to 1937; was three times elected district attorney of Dane County as a Republican, and in 1933 was president of the Wisconsin District Attorney's Association.  From 1925 to 1930 he lectured on business law at Madison Area Technical College.

In 1936, Risser was elected to the 26th Senate District (Dane County) by a wide margin in the general election, after winning a plurality in a three-way Progressive Party primary (Progressive incumbent Harold Groves was not a candidate). He was re-elected in 1940 and 1944; but by 1948 the Wisconsin Progressives had merged back into the Republican Party, and (after having to face a challenge in the Republican primary from a non-Progressive), Risser was defeated for re-election in a four-way race by Gaylord Nelson.

After leaving the Senate, Risser continued to practice law.  He died on September 1, 1971.

Personal life 
Fred Risser married Elizabeth Warner, the daughter of his senior law partner Ernest Warner.

Their son, Fred A. Risser, went on to serve six years in the Wisconsin State Assembly (1957–1962) and 58 years in the Wisconsin State Senate (1962–2021), making him the longest-serving state legislator in American history.

Electoral history

Wisconsin Senate (1936–1948)

References 

People from Buffalo County, Wisconsin
Politicians from Madison, Wisconsin
University of Wisconsin Law School alumni
University of Wisconsin–Madison alumni
Wisconsin lawyers
Wisconsin Progressives (1924)
Republican Party Wisconsin state senators
1900 births
1971 deaths
20th-century American politicians
20th-century American lawyers